Liberální Institut, also known as the Liberal Institute,  is a Czech political think tank based in Prague which aims to promote the principles of classical liberal thought. First known as the F.A. Hayek Liberal Association, it was founded by Jiří Schwarz, Tomáš Ježek and Miroslav Ševčík in the fall of 1989 and later registered on February 6, 1990 under its current name. Currently led by Martin Panek, the Liberal Institute endeavors to develop and apply ideas of classical liberalism in relation to the Czech and European political system. Its activities are based on the principles of individual freedom, a government with limited powers, the free market and peace.

History 
Established during the early stages of the Velvet Revolution in 1989, the FA Hayek’s Liberal Association was founded by Jiří Schwarz, Tomáš Ježek, and Miroslav Ševčík and on February 6, 1990, was registered under the Liberal Institute. The institute has been led by Miroslav Ševčík, Petr Koblovský and Dominik Stroukal, accordingly. After scandals regarding Ševčík surfaced, he left the institute and became the dean of the Faculty of Economics and Public Administration of the University of Economics in Prague. Mr. Ševčík is currently suing the Liberal Institute.

Ideology and values 
The Liberal Institute's activities and publications are centered around the ideas of classical liberalism, libertarianism and anarcho-capitalism. It places a particular emphasis on the reduction of taxes, the elimination of regulations that inhibit business, the fomentation of competition, the abolishment of unnecessary state authorities and Euroscepticism.

the institute's activities revolve around its core values:

 Individual Freedom: Freedom is a value that underlies all other values. There are inalienable rights that precede the government; among them the right to life, freedom, and the search for one's own happiness.
 Government with limited powers: A government with limited powers ensures the protection of the aforementioned inalienable rights. The powers listed above are delegated to it, and the citizens retain the rest. Two crucial components are the government's impartiality and the rule of law, not people.
 Free market: No freedom is possible if private property does not exist, is not respected, or is not enforceable. Private property, freedom of contract, and freedom of association form together a free market that ensures prosperity and protection for the weak and works most efficiently if the government with limited powers intervenes as little as possible.
 Peace : Peace is the necessary precedent for a small government, a free market, and the existence and endurance of freedom. Peace entails both peace of arms at home and in the world.

Activities 
The Liberal institute promotes its core values of individual freedom, free market, private property, and the rule of law through the publication of books, the organization of lectures, in-house research, and media strategies. The Institute partakes in the following activities that are integral to its mission:

Summer School:

Since 1996, the Liberal Institute has organized summer schools for high school and college students that through varied lectures and discussions aims to promote the institute's core principles.

Tax Freedom Day:

Every year the Liberal Institute organizes an event celebrating the day of Czech Tax Freedom, which serves to further understand the size of the state apparatus and the costs it brings Czech citizens every year.

Liberal Institute Annual Lecture: Every year, the Liberal Institute organizes a lecture with a distinguished world figure of classical liberalism, which is awarded the prize "for contributing to proliferation of ideas of liberty and free competition, for honouring private property and the rule of law." List of lecturers is as follows:

 1995 – Gary Becker
 1997 – Milton Friedman
 1998 – Roger Douglas
 1999 – Hans Tietmeyer
 2000 – Grigory Yavlinsky
 2001 – Michael Novak
 2002 – James M. Buchanan
 2003 – Pascal Salin
 2004 – Antonio Martino
 2005 – José Piñera
 2006 – Mart Laar
 2007 – Sam Peltzman
 2008 – William A. Niskanen
 2009 – Deirdre McCloskey
 2010 – Vernon L. Smith
 2011 – Terry L. Anderson
 2012 – Kevin M. Murphy
 2013 – Carlos F. Cáceres
 2015 – Friedrich Schneider
 2016 – Ivan Mikloš
 2017 – John B. Taylor
 2018 – Daniel Hannan
 2019 – Tom G. Palmer
 2020 – David D. Friedman
 2021 – Bryan Caplan

Publications
Throughout its existence, the Liberal Institute has published a number of translations of foreign books in addition to its own publications. Publications published by the Liberal Institute include The Wealth of Nations, Theory of Moral Sentiments, Economics in One Lesson, Man, Economy, and State, Free to Choose, among others. A complete list is available on the institute's website. The institute also publishes Terra Libera and Laissez Faire'', its own journals.

References 

Think tanks based in Europe
Organizations established in 1990
Organizations based in Prague